Gael Newton BFA is an Australian art historian and curator specializing in surveys and studies of photography across the Asia-Pacific region. Newton was formerly the Senior Curator of Australian and International Photography at the National Gallery of Australia (NGA) in Canberra. National Gallery of Australia (NGA) in Canberra.

During her last decade with the National Gallery of Australia, Newton was responsible for the establishment of a survey collection of Asia-Pacific photography spanning from South Asia to the west coast of the Americas. Within this collection, Newton located and negotiated for several major private collections of Asia-Pacific photography including one of 4000 colonial-era Indonesian photographs.

Two major exhibitions were mounted from the new collection; 2008 Picture Paradise: Asia-Pacific photography 1840s-1940s. and Garden of East: photography in Indonesia 1850s–1940s (2014). Newton contributed two South East Asia national surveys to the Routledge 2007 Encyclopedia of Nineteenth Century Photography.

Prior to joining the National Gallery of Australia Newton was the foundation curator of photography at the Art Gallery of New South Wales from 1974-1985. She then relocated to Canberra and from was the National Gallery of Australia visiting curator for Bicentennial Photography Project 1985 to 1988. During this period she researched and mounted the 700-work exhibition  Shades of Light: Photography and Australia 1839-1988, of which the associated publication of that title, remains the standard reference work on the history of Australian photography.

Newton has curated many exhibitions - both historical and contemporary.  Her work includes monographs on Australian photographers: Harold Cazneaux, Max Dupain, John Kauffmann and Tracey Moffatt as well as a number of expatriate Australian and New Zealand photographers including Asia-based photojournalist Brian Brake.

Newton left the National Gallery in September 2014 and commenced work as an independent Curatorial Consultant/Researcher across several fields of interest, including photography, arts and the humanities. She has been providing curatorial advice, research and policy directions on Southeast Asian photography to collectors, dealers and collections and is negotiating several papers and essays for Singaporean museum projects in 2015.

In addition to particular projects on the work of pioneer British travel photographer John Thomson in Southeast Asia, Newton continues research on forgotten Asia-Pacific salon and commercial and modernist art and magazine photographers 1900s-1960s including the regional history of colour photography. Newton has expertise in museum education, internship programs and volunteer management and a strong experience with paper and photographic art conservation practice.

Newton continues to be a regular contributor to magazines and collections of essays as well as a presenter on a range of photographic topics and allied issues.

Newton lives in Canberra, Australia

Publications

References

External links
 National Gallery of Australia
 Art Gallery of New South Wales

Australian curators
Photography curators
Living people
Historians of photography
Year of birth missing (living people)
Australian women curators